Bagniewo  is a village in the administrative district of Gmina Drezdenko, within Strzelce-Drezdenko County, Lubusz Voivodeship, in western Poland.

The village has a population of 100.

References

Bagniewo